Budapest Déli station (Hungarian: Budapest-Déli pályaudvar, literally: Budapest south station), known to locals and foreigners alike simply as the Déli is one of the three main railway stations in Budapest, Hungary.

Located in the 1st District (Várkerület) of Budapest, the station is located in Buda, and primarily serves towns and cities in Transdanubia. The station was first opened in 1861 on the line towards Rijeka (then known as Fiume and part of the Austro-Hungarian Empire) on the Adriatic Sea. Significant damage to the station occurred in the Second World War, and the modern façade of the railway station (the only modern building in all of Budapest's major rail terminals) was eventually completed in 1975.

The station is a major transport hub for the city, with BKV Zrt. trams and buses serving adjoining districts. A metro station (opened in 1972) is located underneath the terminal building, being the western terminus of the M2 (East-West) line of the Budapest Metro.

Public transport
Budapest Déli railway station is located in the 1st district of Budapest, Hungary.

Metro:   
Tram:  17, 56, 56A, 59, 59A, 59B, 61
Bus:  21, 21A, 39, 102, 139, 140, 140A
Nocturnal lines:  960, 990

Future developments
Plans exist to build a cross-city tunnel linking Déli station with Budapest-Nyugati Railway Terminal.

References

External links

Railway stations in Budapest
Railway stations opened in 1861